Thomas Lawson Price (January 19, 1809 – July 15, 1870) was a United States Representative from Missouri.

Biography 
Born near Danville, Virginia, Price attended public schools. He moved to Missouri in 1831 and settled in Jefferson City. He conducted stage lines and engaged in manufacturing and mercantile pursuits. He was the first mayor of Jefferson City, serving 1839–1842. He was an unsuccessful candidate for the State senate in 1845. He was commissioned brevet major general of the Sixth Division of Missouri Militia in 1847.

Price was elected the eighth Lieutenant Governor in 1848 and served from November 20, 1848 until January 3, 1853 under Governor Austin Augustus King. He served as a member of the State house of representatives 1860–1862. He was one of the incorporators of the Capital City Bank and president of the Jefferson Land Co., and actively engaged in the promotion of various railway lines. He became a Brigadier general of Volunteers in 1861 and 1862.

Price was elected as a Democratic Representative to the thirty-seventh Congress to fill the vacancy caused by the expulsion of John W. Reid and served from January 21, 1862, to March 3, 1863. He was an unsuccessful candidate for reelection in 1862 to the Thirty-eighth Congress and an unsuccessful candidate in the 1864 Missouri gubernatorial election. He served as delegate to the Democratic National Convention in 1864 and 1868.

He died in Jefferson City, Missouri, July 15, 1870 at the age of 61. He was interred in a private cemetery. He was reinterred in Riverview Cemetery, Jefferson City, Missouri, in 1912.

References

1809 births
1870 deaths
People from Pittsylvania County, Virginia
American people of Welsh descent
Lieutenant Governors of Missouri
Mayors of places in Missouri
People from Jefferson City, Missouri
Union Army generals
Democratic Party members of the United States House of Representatives from Missouri
19th-century American politicians